The XGP (Extreme Game Player) was a concept portable video game system created by the Korean company GamePark as the follow-up to its GP32 handheld. Initially announced in 2005, the XGP was finally announced in March 2006 along with the release of the similar XGP Mini and the XGP Kids. The company went bankrupt before releasing any of the models.

The XGP was scheduled to be released in three models: the XGP, the XGPmini and the XGP Kids. GamePark said that it did not wish to compete with Sony and Nintendo with the device. The XGP Kids was aimed towards children and therefore had a significantly lower price point. It was designed to run simpler games tailored to an audience besides 'hardcore gamers'. While the GP32 was only available in select markets—Korea and parts of Europe and Asia—or had to be imported, the XGP was expected to be marketed worldwide

Since Gamepark declared bankruptcy in March 2007, the XGP went unreleased. 
This left GP2X—created by splinter company Gamepark Holdings—as the only successor to the GP32 to make it to market.

Models
GamePark was planning on releasing three models of the XGP; the high-end XGP, the middle-range XGP mini, and the low-end XGP Kids.

XGP
The XGP system was to focus on downloadable commercial games, as well as on free homebrew content.

The ability to use Linux on was officially announced, as well as Windows CE and Gamepark's own minimalistic operating system GPOS. The system was designed for multimedia content such as movies, MP3s, and the mobile television standard T-DMB.  It may feature a 4" 16:9 widescreen aspect ratio screen with a display resolution of 480 x 272.

Specifications
 Based on the MagicEyes VRENDER-3D System-on-a-Chip (SoC)
 Screen: 480x272, 1.6 million colors, 4 inch TFT LCD, Widescreen (16:10) aspect ratio
 Main CPU: ARM920T advertised as 266 MHz (actual VRENDER-3D SoC contains a 200 MHz ARM920T)
 OS: Updated GPOS, Linux, and possibly a WindowsCE "option" as well.
 Graphics Accelerator: 1.5 million polygons per second (OpenGL ES supported)Sound: 64Polys 44.1 kHz, 16 bit stereo soundNetwork: WiFi - 802.11 b/g, WiBroNAND Flash Memory: 64 MBRAM: 64MB DDR SDRAM (128MB at release time was rumored)Storage: Secure Digital cardBattery: Built-in Rechargeable Lithium ion batteryOther Features: TV-Out, USB 2.0, open sdkCustomer Target Price: $300

XGP Mini

The XGP Mini's specifications are similar to the XGP's, but the device was much smaller than the XGP—much like the Game Boy Micro as compared to the Game Boy Advance.  In contrast to the XGP, it featured no wireless connectivity and half the DDR SDRAM at 32MB.SpecificationsBased on the MagicEyes VRENDER-3D System-on-a-Chip (SoC)
Screen: 2.2" 320*240, 256k colors, 4:3 Aspect Ratio.
Main CPU: ARM920T Advertised as 266 MHz (Actual VRENDER-3D SoC contains a 200 MHz ARM920T)
OS: GPOS
Graphics Accelerator: 1.5 million polygons per second (OpenGL ES supported)
Sound: 64Polys 44.1 kHz, 16 bit Stereo sound
NAND Flash Memory: 64 MB
RAM: 32MB DDR SDRAM (Rumored to be 96MB at launch)
Storage: Secure Digital card
Battery: Built-in Rechargeable Lithium ion battery
Other Features: USB 2.0, open SDK
Customer Target Price: $150

XGP Kids

The XGP Kids was technically similar to the GP32. The two consoles' specifications differ in screen size and resolution, available memory (Kids adds 2MB NOR Flash memory), processor type, and storage. These differences would prevent the console from being backwards compatible with the GP32, although GP32 software could be reprogrammed to work on the XGP Kids. The device was intended to be relatively inexpensive and to give a chance to those who missed out on the GP32's limited production run to get something very much like a BLU+. The XGP Kids, like the XGP Mini, will have a smaller screen (at only ) than the XGP and GP32.

Specifications
Screen: 2.2" 220x176 LCD, 65k colors, 4:3.
Main CPU: ARM940T 140 MHz
OS: GPOS
Sound: 16 bit Stereo sound, 64Polys 44.1 kHz
Storage:  2MB NOR Flash, Secure Digital card
RAM: 8MB DDR SDRAM
Battery: 2 AA Batteries
Other Features: USB 1.1, open SDK
Customer Target Price: $75

See also
GP32 - The predecessor of the XGP
GP2X - The unofficial successor of the GP32, designed by GamePark Holdings
GamePark Holdings - The creators of the GP2X
GamePark - The creators of the GP32 & XGP
GP2X Wiz - The official successor of the GP2X
OpenPandora - The unofficial successor of the GP2X

References

Official GamePark product page for the XGP
Digital World Tokyo: E3 '06: Game Park XGP aiming high

External links
 GP32X - English community news and forums for all Gamepark handhelds
 GP32Spain - Spanish news and community website
 GP32Club - French news and community website
 Gamepark Newbie - FAQs, guides, and information about the XGP consoles as well as GP32 and GP2X.
 gp2x.info | gp2x and xgp forums - Info, news and development forums.
 XgpGaming - Gaming, Info and Review Website

Seventh-generation video game consoles
Handheld game consoles
Game Park
Vaporware game consoles
ARM-based video game consoles